"Kräm (så nära får ingen gå)" is a song by Swedish alternative rock band Kent, released on 9 February 1996 as the lead single from their second studio album, Verkligen. The CD single contains the two b-sides, "Rödljus" and "En helt ny karriär". These two tracks were recorded, produced and mixed by Kent and Heikki Kiviaho, and were later released on the compilation B-sidor 95–00 in 2000.

The song peaked at number four in Sweden, becoming the band's first single to chart.

Track listing

Charts

References

1996 singles
Kent (band) songs
Songs written by Joakim Berg
Songs written by Martin Sköld
1996 songs
RCA Victor singles